Rainsville is a small unincorporated community in Pine Township, Warren County, in the U.S. state of Indiana.

History
Rainsville was platted on April 16, 1833, by Isaac Rains, who had built a mill here the previous year; the town was named for him.  A post office was established on February 5, 1836, and closed on September 15, 1904.

Geography 
Big Pine Creek flows from Pine Village, around the north side of the town, and continues to the southwest.

Demographics

References

Gallery 

Unincorporated communities in Indiana
Unincorporated communities in Warren County, Indiana
Populated places established in 1833
1833 establishments in Indiana